John W. Patterson (March 2, 1872 – August 23, 1940) was an American baseball outfielder in the Negro leagues. He played for major teams from 1893 to 1907.

Career

Patterson debuted with the Lincoln, Nebraska Giants of 1890, a black team, and played for the Plattsmouth club in the Nebraska State League during the 1892 season, before the baseball color line was sharply drawn. In 1893 he joined the Cuban Giants and won a starting position for 1894.

He played with the Page Fence Giants which eventually became the Chicago Columbia Giants in 1899 where Patterson was a manager and outfielder.

He appeared on teams lists in Chicago from 1899 to 1902,. then played a year for the Philadelphia Giants, then moved on to the Cuban X-Giants, then the Brooklyn Royal Giants.

Fellow 1904 teammate Jimmy Smith called Patterson "one of the brainiest and shrewdest leaders of any team of color."

Patterson played as late as 1908 for the Philadelphia Giants.

Later life

After his baseball career, John W. Patterson became the first African-American police officer in Battle Creek, Michigan in 1909. He served as an officer for over 30 years, and was a friend of heavyweight boxer Jack Johnson. Patterson ruptured his groin on the job in 1940, which later became infected. He died later that year.

References

 
(Riley.) John Patterson, Personal profiles at Negro Leagues Baseball Museum. – identical to Riley (confirmed 2010-04-13)

External links

1872 births
1940 deaths
Cuban Giants players
Columbia Giants players
Cuban X-Giants players
Brooklyn Royal Giants players
Page Fence Giants players
Philadelphia Giants players
Baseball players from Nebraska
Sportspeople from Omaha, Nebraska
People from Battle Creek, Michigan
Sportspeople from Battle Creek, Michigan
20th-century African-American people
Baseball outfielders